The SYAC UAV are a type of Chinese UAVs developed by Shenyang Aircraft Corporation (SYAC), some of which have entered service with Chinese military and local law enforcement and governmental establishments.

Divine Eagle

Divine Eagle (Shen-Diao or Shendiao, 神雕) is a little-known jet-powered Chinese UAV under development reportedly since 2012. It was possibly in service as of 2018, with its existence first revealed in the Chinese military aircraft development genealogy map (中国军用飞机发展族谱图) as a high altitude long endurance (HALE) counter stealth UAV (高空远程反隐身无人机). It was confirmed by Chinese official sources when the autobiography of aircraft designer academician Li Ming (李明) was published in 2012, in which it was revealed that the Divine Eagle was designed by the 601st Institute (more commonly known as Shenyang Aircraft Design Institute) of SYAC, originally as a proof of concept aircraft for the development of counter stealth UAV. A graphic from a Chinese publication showed the employment concept for a large UAV similar to the Shenyang 'Divine Eagle' concept in a multi-platform warning system. Sukhoi's S-62 UAV concept and variations demonstrated in the 2013 Moscow Airshow are similar to the Divine Eagle，and Sukhoi officials noted that China had expressed "great interest" in the Zond designs. The first confirmed photo of Divine Eagle was revealed in mid 2015 when a photograph of it taxiing was published on the internet.

Divine Eagle is currently the largest UAV in China (as of 2015), with its length approaching that of Shenyang J-11. The photo of Divine Eagle taxiing suggests a fuselage height to length ratio of 1:12, giving probable length of 14.4 to 18 meters, and the wingspan is estimated at 40 to 50 meters. Divine Eagle adopts a unique layout in that it is in twin boom layout with twin tail and what appears to be a low wing configuration. The fuselages have bulbous noses that house satellite communication antennas, and the canard wing is mounted between them but not at the leading edge. A much longer high-aspect ratio wing is mounted aft and an apparent high-bypass turbofan is mounted between two large vertical stabilisers. Divine Eagle carries up to seven AESA radars. Its wind tunnel tests were up to an altitude of 25 km and a speed of Mach 0.8.

XLB Patroller
The XLB Patroller (XLB Xun-Luo-Bing or XLB Xunluobing, XLB 巡逻兵) fixed-wing UAV was developed by Shenyang Aircraft Design Institute (SYADI) of AVIC. XLB Patroller is in conventional layout and high wing configuration, with tricycle landing gear and T-tail. Propulsion is provided by a two-blade propeller driven tractor engine mounted in the nose. XLB Patroller is one of the few Chinese UAVs powered by alternative energy source, namely, fuel cell. The entire system consists of ground control station with one or two UAVs, and maintenance equipment.

Specification
Wingspan (m): 10.5
Length (m): 4.7
Height (m): 1.8
Weight (kg): 240
Payload (kg): 30
Speed (km/hr): 150
Ceiling (km): 5
Endurance (hr): 3 – 5
Temperature allowed for operation (°C): - 40 to 70
Data link: C band
Data transmission range (km): > 50

See also
 List of unmanned aerial vehicles of China

References

Unmanned aerial vehicles of China